Seth Towns (born November 5, 1997) is an American former college basketball player for the Ohio State Buckeyes of the Big Ten Conference. He previously played for the Harvard Crimson.

Early life and high school career
Towns is from Columbus, Ohio and attended Northland High School. He was recruited to Harvard by coach Tommy Amaker, who told him a Harvard degree would give him a platform that went beyond basketball and that he would be crazy not to come to Harvard.

Recruiting
On June 15, 2015, Towns committed to play college basketball for Harvard over Ohio State and Michigan.

College career
Towns led the Crimson in scoring with 15.8 points per game as a sophomore while also contributing 5.4 rebounds and 1.8 assists per game. He shot 49.3 percent of his 3-point attempts in Ivy League play and led Harvard to a share of the regular season championship. At the conclusion of the regular season Towns was named Ivy League Player of the Year, becoming the third sophomore to receive the honor. He scored 24 points and 12 rebounds in the Ivy League semifinal versus Cornell.

On November 3, 2018, it was announced that Towns was out indefinitely with a knee injury. Towns would miss his junior season.

On December 23, 2019, it was announced that Towns would undergo a season ending surgery, ending his tenure at Harvard. On March 21, 2020, he decided to transfer to Ohio State, choosing the Buckeyes over Duke. Towns was detained by police at a protest on May 29. He was involved in a car accident on November 25, and missed the game against Illinois State. Towns averaged 3.8 points and 2.2 rebounds per game during the 2020–21 season. He underwent back surgery in September 2021 and was expected to miss several months.

On September 4, 2022, Towns announced that he was stepping away from basketball.

Career statistics

College

|-
| style="text-align:left;"| 2016–17
| style="text-align:left;"| Harvard
| 28 || 20 || 24.6 || .428 || .388 || .821 || 4.4 || 1.3 || 1.0 || .5 || 12.3
|-
| style="text-align:left;"| 2017–18
| style="text-align:left;"| Harvard
| 30 || 24 || 27.9 || .419 || .441 || .805 || 5.7 || 1.8 || .8 || .6 || 16.0
|-
| style="text-align:left;"| 2018–19
| style="text-align:left;"| Harvard
| style="text-align:center;" colspan="11"|  Injured
|-
|-
| style="text-align:left;"| 2019–20
| style="text-align:left;"| Harvard
| style="text-align:center;" colspan="11"|  Injured
|-
| style="text-align:left;"| 2020–21
| style="text-align:left;"| Ohio State
| 25 || 0 || 10.8 || .421 || .341 || .800 || 2.2 || .3 || .2 || .2 || 3.8
|- class="sortbottom"
| style="text-align:center;" colspan="2"| Career
| 83 || 44 || 21.7 || .423 || .407 || .811 || 4.2 || 1.2 || .7 || .5 || 11.1

References

External links
Ohio State Buckeyes bio
Harvard Crimson bio

1997 births
Living people
21st-century African-American sportspeople
African-American basketball players
American men's basketball players
Basketball players from Columbus, Ohio
Harvard Crimson men's basketball players
Ohio State Buckeyes men's basketball players
Small forwards